Bhakkha is a traditional food of the Rajbanshi and Tharu people of  South eastern Nepal. It is a fluffy rice cake.

Bhakkha is prepared by lightly soaking milled rice in water and massaging with palms. It is then sieved to separate sand grain sized pieces. The sieved rices grains is lightly compacted in a bowl and steamed. Traditionally, the steaming is done in a clay pot. It is served in breakfast or as a snack with freshly prepared tomato pickle.

See also 
Nepalese cuisine
List of Nepalese dishes

References 

Nepalese cuisine